Williams v. Vidmar, 367 F. Supp. 2d 1265 (N.D. Cal. 2005), was a lawsuit filed in federal court on November 22, 2004. It alleged that Patricia Vidmar, the then Principal of Stevens Creek Elementary School in Cupertino, California, was interfering with the first amendment rights of Stephen Williams, a fifth-grade teacher at Stevens Creek Elementary School. The lawsuit also named the board members of the Cupertino Union School District as defendants.

In the weeks before the lawsuit, parents of students at the school had been complaining to Vidmar about Williams, who described himself as an "Orthodox Christian," handing out religiously-themed pamphlets in his classes. Vidmar, herself a Christian Republican, began to screen Williams's handouts.

The lawsuit was handled for Williams by the Alliance Defense Fund (ADF), an Arizona-based legal group whose mission was to defend  "the right to hear and speak the Truth through strategy, training,  funding and litigation" in response to "challenges to people of faith to live and proclaim the Gospel." In 2003, the ADF received  $16,474,818 from donors, more than covering their $2,003,654 in General and Administrative expenses. Since 2001, the ADF has been targeting public schools with lawsuits. As Mike Johnson of the ADF told the Baptist Press News (12/20/04), "The school ground is the battleground now in the culture war when it comes to religious expression. Teachers are in the crosshairs."

The ADF issued a press release titled "Declaration of Independence Banned from Classroom," a title that caused considerable controversy and some outrage among listeners to various news outlets. This press release was especially publicized by various Fox News Network shows, and resulted in over a thousand hostile messages being sent to the school, some containing threats. The effects on the community were chronicled by an article in the New Yorker.

On April 28, 2005, Judge James Ware dismissed all but one of the charges in the lawsuit.

On August 11, 2005, the lawsuit was settled. Under the settlement, filed in federal court in San Jose, no money
would exchange hands, and no school policies would be altered. The parties agreed not to file future claims based on the complaint.

Williams resigned from the school at the end of the 2004-2005 school year.

References

2005 in United States case law
United States District Court for the Northern District of California cases
United States First Amendment case law
Alliance Defending Freedom litigation
Cupertino Union School District